Sheffield United competed in the Football League Championship during the 2007–08 football season, after being relegated from the Premier League during 2006–07.

Season summary
Manager Bryan Robson was dismissed in February with Sheffield United nowhere near a position good enough for an immediate return to the Premier League. His replacement, Kevin Blackwell, improved United's form sufficiently that they were still mathematically in with a shout of a play-off place until the last day of the season, but a shock loss to relegation-threatened Southampton ended any such hopes (though results elsewhere meant that the Blades wouldn't have made the play-offs even had they won), and United finished in a relatively disappointing 9th position.

Kit
Sheffield United maintained both their kit manufacturing agreement with French company Le Coq Sportif, who produced a new home kit for the season, and their kit sponsorship agreement with American bank Capital One. A new away strip with fluorescent green shirts and black shirts and socks with fluorescent green trim was also introduced.

Final league table

Results
Sheffield United's score comes first

Legend

Football League Championship

FA Cup

League Cup

Players

First-team squad
Squad at end of season

Left club during season

References

Notes

Sheffield United
Sheffield United F.C. seasons